Colostrinin (also known as CLN, proline-rich polypeptides or PRP) is a naturally occurring mixture of proline-rich polypeptides derived from colostrum.

Early work on Colostrinin

Colostrinin was originally identified by scientists working in Poland in the 1970s.  Colostrinin is derived from colostrum, which is present in the pre-milk fluid produced from mammary glands in the first few days after parturition. It is also known as proline-rich polypeptides, since sequence analysis of the peptides present in this mixture reveals an unusually high proportion of this amino acid residue. The amino acid compositions of Colostrinin from ovine, bovine, and human colostrum are very similar. Colostrinin was first characterized in animal and in-vitro studies as a substance that generally stimulates the immune response. Such an immunomodulatory action may be important in the treatment of a variety of diseases and is consistent with the beneficial effect of colostrum in promoting the development of the immune system in newborn mammals.

Preparation and synthesis

Colostrinin is obtained from bovine colostrum by alcohol extraction and filtration. A patented method  outlines the steps that can be used to produce this substance on an industrial scale. In this method, an alcohol, such as ethanol or methanol, is used to create an alcohol phase. This phase is enriched with the peptide fraction, from which Colostrinin is recovered and purified.

Colostrinin is incompletely defined chemically. Initially, it was assumed to consist of a single protein with a molecular weight of approximately 17 to 18 kDa. However, subsequent studies showed that Colostrinin largely consists of a mixture of at least 32 peptides ranging in size from 0.5 to 3 kDa. Most of the peptides appear to be derived from proteolytic processing of the milk proteins β-casein and a β-casein homolog. Whether non-peptide components of the mixture contribute to the biological activity is unknown. However, the biological activity of Colostrinin does seem to be due to more than one of the components, since its effects cannot be completely mimicked by any one of the peptide components tested so far.

Health benefits

PRP-rich preparations from bovine colostrum have shown possible efficacy against various illnesses including neurodegenerative diseases (such as Alzheimer's), viral infections, and ailments characterized by an overactive immune system, such as allergies, asthma and autoimmune diseases. Some recent research has also indicated possible efficacy in combating obesity. Colostrinin's potential as a cognitive enhancer is fairly well-documented.

Significant research has been done on Colostrinin's possible efficacy in Alzheimer's disease, the most common form of dementia. The disease is characterized by extracellular senile plaques consisting mainly of aggregated amyloid-beta (Aß) and intracellular neurofibrillary tangles, containing the cytoskeletal protein tau.

A placebo-controlled clinical trial with Colostrinin in 106 people with Alzheimer's over 30 weeks was completed in 2002 and the results appeared to demonstrate efficacy in a significant proportion of patients treated. The results showed that approximately 40% of patients on Colostrinin were stabilized or improved after 15 weeks of therapy, based on an Analysis of Overall Response. 33% of patients continued to show stabilization or improvement after 30 weeks of treatment, although levels of benefit were slightly higher at the 15-week stage of the trial. The dosage regimen used for the trial was 100 micrograms of Colostrinin administered every second day for three weeks followed by a two-week period without Colostrinin.

A 2010 study demonstrated that Colostrinin significantly relieved amyloid-beta (Aß)-induced cytotoxicity, alleviated the effect of Aß-induced cytotoxicity and caused a significant reduction in the elevated levels of the antioxidant enzyme SOD1.

An in-vitro study completed in 2005 showed that Colostrinin can increase the lifespan of cells isolated from inbred mice predisposed to premature aging and death. This study showed the effect of Colostrinin on the mitochondria of cells isolated from strains of senescence-prone (SAMP1) and senescence-resistant (SAMR1) mice. The data showed that cells from SAMP1 mice produce more reactive oxygen species (ROS), exhibit severe mitochondrial dysfunction, and have a decreased lifespan compared to the cells from SAMR1 mice. Addition of Colostrinin to SAMP1 cells significantly decreased ROS levels, normalized mitochondrial function and increased the lifespan to levels similar to those in SAMR1 cells. This in-vitro effect was followed up in actual mice as well.

Another study showed that Colostrinin induces neurite outgrowth of pheochromocytoma cells and inhibits beta amyloid-induced apoptosis. The neurite outgrowth caused by Colostrinin appears to activate signaling pathways common to cell proliferation and differentiation, and to mediate a wide spectrum of activities that are similar to those of hormones and known nerve growth factors. These findings would seem to suggest that Colostrinin treatment may control the expression of genes that are involved in the development, maintenance, and regeneration of neurons in the central nervous system, and thus may also explain the improvements observed in Alzheimer's patients with mild-to-moderate dementia during treatment with Colostrinin.
Colostrinin affects the early stages of Vitamin D3-induced phenotypic (CD11b and CD14) and functional (phagocytic) differentiation/maturation of monocytes/macrophages. When Colostrinin was administered to the cells after treatment with Vitamin D3, no attenuation of the differentiation/maturation process of the HL-60 cells was observed. Therefore, Colostrinin may regulate in this way the inflammatory processes in which these cells participate.

Another study in day-old domestic chicks showed enhancement of long-term memory retention. A study conducted at the University of Texas Medical Branch and published online in March 2008 in the International Archives of Allergy and Immunology showed that Colostrinin is non-allergenic and can prevent allergic inflammation due to common indoor and outdoor allergens. The study used a well characterized mouse model of allergic airway inflammation. Colostrinin (given orally, intranasally or intraperitoneally) significantly decreased IgE/IgG1 production, airway eosinophilia, mucin production and hypersensitivity induced by allergenic extracts from ragweed pollen and house dust mites. In contrast, colostrum induced positive inflammatory responses.

Anti-aging potential

A 2006 study published in the Journal of Experimental Therapeutics and Oncology indicated that Colostrinin may affect the aging process by reducing the spontaneous or induced mutation frequency in the DNA of cells. Such DNA damage is implicated in the general process of aging. The study, which was performed in both hamster and human cells, looked at the effect of Colostrinin on the frequency of defined DNA mutations in these cells as they occur naturally and when induced by various known chemical or physical agents. In cells stressed oxidatively, Colostrinin reduced the frequency of mutation induced by reactive oxygen species (ROS) to nearly background levels in a dose-dependent manner. Likewise, Colostrinin reduced the frequency of mutation caused by two mutagenic agents, methyl methane sulfonate and mitomycin-C, the latter often used in cancer chemotherapy. Notably Colostrinin decreased UVA and UVB radiation induced mutation frequency. These damaging radiations are a natural part of sunlight. UVA radiation plays a role in the induction of malignant melanoma and UVB radiation is the primary cause of squamous cell carcinomas. It is suggested that the antimutagenic properties of Colostrinin are achieved via multiple mechanisms - by decreasing intracellular levels of ROS and so preventing DNA damage and by increasing the efficiency of natural DNA repair mechanisms.

There were also studies of the Colostrinin components and their possible effect on aggregation of amyloid beta (Abeta1-42). Results presented suggest that NP - Colostrinin component, can directly interact with amyloid beta, inhibit its aggregation and disrupt existing aggregates acting as a beta sheet breaker and reduce toxicity induced by aggregated forms of Abeta.

Toxicity

There has been very little mention of toxicity in most published animal studies using Colostrinin, which may suggest that it exhibits low toxicity. Generally, treatment with Colostrinin in clinical studies has been well tolerated by both animals and humans, with any side-effects being mild and transient.

Use by humans

Tablets or capsules containing Colostrinin are available in many countries in the world and are sold as an OTC dietary supplement under various trade names, including Colostrinin, MemoryAid, CogniSure, Cognase, Cognate, Memory Protect and Dyna.

References

Reference 10 citation:

External links
ReGen Therapeutics Plc homepage

Dietary supplements